The 1983 FIBA World Championship for Women squads were the squads of the 1983 FIBA World Championship for Women. Each one of the 14 teams at the tournament selected a squad of 12 players.

Group A

Bulgaria

Cuba

South Korea

Peru

Group B

Australia

Japan

Poland

Yugoslavia
4 Slavica Šuka
5 Snežana Božinović
6 Jelica Komnenović
7 Olivera Čangalović
8 Olivera Krivokapić
9 Stojna Vangelovska
10 Slađana Golić
11 Polona Dornik
12 Biljana Majstorović
13 Jasmina Perazić
14 Cvetana Dekleva
15 Marija Uzelac
coach Milan Vasojević

Group C

Canada

China

Soviet Union

Zaire

References

FIBA Women's Basketball World Cup squads